The following is the 1969–70 network television schedule for the three major English language commercial broadcast networks in the United States. The schedule covers primetime hours from September 1969 through August 1970. The schedule is followed by a list per network of returning series, new series, and series cancelled after the 1968–69 season.

New fall series are highlighted in bold.

Each of the 30 highest-rated shows is listed with its rank and rating as determined by Nielsen Media Research.

 Yellow indicates the programs in the top 10 for the season.
 Cyan indicates the programs in the top 20 for the season.
 Magenta indicates the programs in the top 30 for the season.

The National Educational Television (NET) was in operation, but the schedule was set by each local station.

Sunday

Monday

Tuesday

Wednesday

Thursday

Friday

Saturday

By network

ABC

Returning Series
The ABC Sunday Night Movie
The ABC Wednesday Night Movie
Animal World
Bewitched
The Dating Game
The F.B.I.
The Flying Nun
The Ghost & Mrs. Muir (moved from NBC)
Here Come the Brides
The Hollywood Palace
It Takes a Thief
Land of the Giants
The Lawrence Welk Show
Let's Make a Deal
The Mod Squad
The Newlywed Game
The Smothers Brothers Comedy Hour
That Girl
This Is Tom Jones

New Series
ABC Movie of the Week
The Brady Bunch
The Courtship of Eddie's Father
The Engelbert Humperdinck Show *
Jimmy Durante Presents the Lennon Sisters *
Johnny Cash Presents the Everly Brothers Show
Lana Turner starring in Harold Robbins' "The Survivors"
Love, American Style
Marcus Welby, M.D.
Mr. Deeds Goes to Town
The Music Scene
Nanny and the Professor *
The New People
Now *
Paris 7000 *
Pat Paulsen's Half a Comedy Hour *
Room 222

Not returning from 1968–69:
The Avengers
The Big Valley
The Dick Cavett Show (moved to late night)
The Don Rickles Show
Felony Squad
The Generation Gap
The Guns of Will Sonnett
Happening '69
The John Davidson Show
Journey to the Unknown
Judd, for the Defense
The King Family Show
N.Y.P.D.
Operation: Entertainment
The Outcasts
Peyton Place
Saga of Western Man
That's Life
Turn-On
The Ugliest Girl in Town
What's it All About, World?

CBS

Returning Series
The 21st Century
The Beverly Hillbillies
The Carol Burnett Show
CBS News Hour
CBS Playhouse
CBS Thursday Night Movie
60 Minutes
The Doris Day Show
The Ed Sullivan Show
Family Affair
Get Smart (moved from NBC)
The Glen Campbell Goodtime Hour
The Good Guys
Green Acres
Gunsmoke
Hawaii Five-O
Hee Haw
Here's Lucy
Hogan's Heroes
The Jackie Gleason Show
Lancer
Lassie
Mannix
Mayberry R.F.D.
Mission: Impossible
My Three Sons
Petticoat Junction
The Red Skelton Hour
The Wild Wild West

New Series
CBS News Adventure *
Comedy Tonight *
The Governor & J.J.
The Jim Nabors Hour
The Leslie Uggams Show
Medical Center
The Tim Conway Show *
To Rome with Love
Where's Huddles? *

Not returning from 1968–69:
Blondie
Gentle Ben
Gomer Pyle, U.S.M.C.
The Jonathan Winters Show
The Liberace Show
The Queen & I

NBC

Returning Series
Adam-12
The Andy Williams Show
Bonanza
Columbo
Daniel Boone
The Dean Martin Show
Dragnet 1970
First Tuesday
The High Chaparral
I Dream of Jeannie
Ironside
Julia
Kraft Music Hall
The Name of the Game
NBC Monday Night at the Movies
The NBC Mystery Movie
NBC Saturday Night at the Movies
Rowan & Martin's Laugh-In
The Virginian
Wild Kingdom
The Wonderful World of Disney

New Series
Andy Williams Presents Ray Stevens *
The Bill Cosby Show
The Bold Ones
Bracken's World
Dean Martin Presents the Golddiggers in London
The Debbie Reynolds Show
Jambo
Letters to Laugh-In *
My World and Welcome to It
Night Gallery
Strange Report
Then Came Bronson

Not returning from 1968–69:
The Beautiful Phyllis Diller Show
Get Smart (moved to CBS)
The Ghost & Mrs. Muir (moved to ABC)
The Jerry Lewis Show
The Mothers-in-Law
My Friend Tony
The New Adventures of Huckleberry Finn
The Outsider
The Saint
Star Trek

Note: The * indicates that the program was introduced in midseason.

References

Additional sources
 Castleman, H. & Podrazik, W. (1982). Watching TV: Four Decades of American Television. New York: McGraw-Hill. 314 pp.
 McNeil, Alex. Total Television. Fourth edition. New York: Penguin Books. .
 Brooks, Tim & Marsh, Earle (1964). The Complete Directory to Prime Time Network TV Shows (3rd ed.). New York: Ballantine. .

United States primetime network television schedules
1969 in American television
1970 in American television